Quercus lanata, the woolly-leaved oak, is a species of Quercus native to southern and southeastern Asia, including India (from eastern Uttarakhand to Arunachal Pradesh), Bhutan, Nepal, Indochina (Vietnam, Myanmar, northern Thailand), and southwestern China (Guangxi, Tibet, Yunnan). The leaves are thick and leathery, green on top but covered in thick wool on the underside. It is classified in subgenus Cerris, section Ilex.

This oak tree grows up to 20 m tall, and under the synonym Quercus oblongata has been recorded from Vietnam, where it may be called sồi bạc or sồi bạch mao.

Subspecies
Two subspecies are recognized by Plants of the World Online :
Quercus lanata subsp. lanata, synonyms including Quercus oblongata – throughout the range of the species
Quercus lanata subsp. leiocarpa (A.Camus) Menitsky – from the Assam region to Indo-China

References

lanata
Trees of China
Flora of Indo-China
Trees of the Indian subcontinent
Plants described in 1819